Canariomys is an extinct genus of rodents (Old World rats and mice) that once existed on the islands of Tenerife and Gran Canaria, part of the Canary Islands, Spain. They were herbivores; their diet was based on plant materials, probably soft vegetables such as roots, ferns, and berries, but not grass. C. tamarani were considered herbivores, eating everything plant-like except grass with good digging skills. While C. bravoi were considered as a rat character, because of its large size, with an omnivorous diet with good climbing skills. They were one of two groups of rodents native to the archipelago, alongside the lava mouse (Malpaisomys insularis), which was native to Fuerteventura and Lanzarote. 

It is generally believed that the species of Tenerife lived in a wooded area linked to the laurisilva and that it had climbing abilities, whereas the species of Gran Canaria lived in more open environments and was more linked to the excavation of burrows.

Two species are currently recognized:
 Tenerife giant rat, Canariomys bravoi (Tenerife, Pleistocene-Holocene)
 Gran Canaria giant rat, Canariomys tamarani (Gran Canaria, Pleistocene-Holocene)
Both species became extinct around the beginning of the 1st Millennium, shortly after the first human settlement of the islands by the Guanches.

Genetic evidence indicates that the genus is nested within Arvicanthis, specifically within the African grass rat (A. niloticus) species complex, with an estimated divergence from its mainland relatives around 650,000 years ago.

References 

 
 

 
Extinct mammals
Extinct rodents
Extinct animals of Africa
Prehistoric murids
Prehistoric rodent genera